Tigon British Film Productions or Tigon was a film production and distribution company, founded by Tony Tenser in 1966.

It is best remembered for its horror films, particularly Witchfinder General (directed by Michael Reeves, 1968) and The Blood on Satan's Claw (directed by Piers Haggard, 1971). Other Tigon films include The Creeping Flesh, The Sorcerers and Doomwatch (1972), based on the TV series of the same name.

A 1990s book by Andy Boot (Fragments of Fear) highlighted the importance of Tigon and Tony Tenser to the British horror genre but contained a number of factual errors, including the misidentification of a number of films as Tigon productions. This misidentification continues to this day.

History
Tigon was based at Hammer House in Wardour Street, London, and released a wide range of films from sexploitation (Zeta One), to an acclaimed television adaptation of August Strindberg's Miss Julie (1972) starring Helen Mirren. The largest part of its output, however, was made up by low-budget horror films in direct competition for audiences with Hammer Film Productions and Amicus Productions.

In February 2005, a DVD box set of Tigon films was released by Anchor BayUK. The box set contains only Witchfinder General, The Body Stealers, The Haunted House of Horror, The Blood on Satan's Claw, The Beast in the Cellar, and Virgin Witch, and consists of UK rather than US prints, in Region 2 – PAL format. Providing an audio commentary on a number of the films, as well as writing the productions notes, was the author and film critic John Hamilton.

The same year, FAB press in the UK published John Hamilton's biography of Tony Tenser, a comprehensive look at the career of Tigon's founder and the man dubbed "the Godfather of British Exploitation". Hamilton had access to production files, diaries and personal correspondence, as well as recording a number of exclusive interviews with the likes of Vernon Sewell, Michael Armstrong, Christopher Lee, Ian Ogilvy and Peter Sasdy. He also recorded over 18 hours of interviews with Tony Tenser himself, all of which went to create an in-depth look not only at the making of the films but the machinations involved with running a film company. The book was critically acclaimed in a number of newspapers and magazines, including The New York Times and The Independent, as well as Film Review and SPFX (the latter dubbed it the "best single volume history ever written on British horror").

Hamilton has gone on to write a number of articles on Tigon film productions, published in magazines like The Darkside, Shivers and Little Shoppe of Horrors; in 2015, Hemlock Books published Tigon: Blood on a Budget, the author's look at the studio's horror and fantasy movies.

Filmography

As production company
Sandy the Seal (1965 - released 1969)
The Sorcerers (1967)
Mini Weekend (1968)
The Blood Beast Terror (1968)
Witchfinder General (1968)
Love in Our Time (1968)
Curse of the Crimson Altar (1968)
The Body Stealers (1969)
What's Good for the Goose (1969)
The Haunted House of Horror (1969)
Zeta One (1969)
The Nude Vampire (1970)
The Beast in the Cellar (1970)
1917 (1970)
Monique (1970)
The Blood on Satan's Claw (1971)
The Magnificent Seven Deadly Sins (1971)
Black Beauty (1971)
Hannie Caulder (1971)
Au Pair Girls (1972)
Virgin Witch (1972)
Doomwatch (1972)
Neither the Sea Nor the Sand (1972)
The Creeping Flesh (1973)

As distributor
Castle of the Living Dead (1964)
Terror-Creatures from the Grave (1965)
Snow Treasure (1968)
O.K. Yevtushenko (1968 – released 1975)
Simon, Simon (1970)
Permissive (1970)
Clegg (1970)
Stork (1971)
Miss Julie (1972) (TV movie)
Wrong Way (1972 – released 1981)
Sex, Love and Marriage (1972)
The Flesh and Blood Show (1972)
The Sex Thief (1973)
A Candle for the Devil (1973)
Murder Inferno (1973)
The Great McGonagall (1974)
Double Agent 73 (1974)
All I Want Is You... and You... and You... (1974)
Sizzlers (1976)
Intimate Games (1976)
Erotic Confessions (1976 – released 1981)
The Red Nights of the Gestapo (1977)
Come Play With Me (1977)
Tänzerinnen für Tanger (1977)
The Playbirds (1978)
The Violation of the Bitch (1978)
Confessions from the David Galaxy Affair (1979)
Queen of the Blues (1979)
The Ecstasy Girls (1979)
Sex with the Stars (1980)
Come Play with Me 2 (1980)
Rude Boy (1980)
Emanuelle: Queen Bitch (1980)
Hotel Paradise (1980)
Mary Millington's World Striptease Extravaganza (1981)
Emmanuelle in Soho (1981)
Ring of Desire (1981)
Electric Blue - The Movie (1982)
Hellcat Mud Wrestlers (1983)

Further reading

Boot, Andy. "The Terrors of Tigon" in his ''Fragments of Fear: An Illustrated History of British Horror Films . London & San Francisco: Creation Books, 1996, pp. 172–91.
Hamilton, John: "Beasts in the Cellar. The Exploitation Film Career of Tony Tenser". FAB press, Guildford, UK 2005
Hamilton, John: "Tigon. Blood on a Budget". Hemlock Books, Hailsham, E.Sussex. 2015.

References

Film production companies of the United Kingdom
British companies established in 1966